The Carroll-Livingston Activities Association, or CLAA, is a high school athletic conference comprising small-size high schools located in northwest Missouri, northeast of Kansas City. The conference members are located in Caldwell, Carroll, Chariton, Livingston, Randolph, and Ray counties.

Members
As of 2021, the Carroll-Livingston Activities Association consists of twelve high schools. The conference consists of Class 1 schools (in boys' basketball), the smallest classes in Missouri.

References

Missouri high school athletic conferences
High school sports conferences and leagues in the United States